Percina austroperca, the southern logperch, is a small species of freshwater ray-finned fish, a darter from the subfamily Etheostomatinae, part of the family Percidae, which also contains the perches, ruffes and pikeperches. They are highly resilient with a minimum population doubling time of less than 15 months. It is found in the Escambia and Choctawhatchee river systems in western Florida and southern Alabama.

References

External links

austroperca
Taxa named by Bruce A. Thompson
Fish described in 1995